Ivan Dmitrievich Barbashev (born 14 December 1995) is a Russian professional ice hockey forward for the Vegas Golden Knights of the National Hockey League (NHL). Barbashev was selected by the St. Louis Blues in the second round, 33rd overall, of the 2014 NHL Entry Draft. 

Born and raised in Russia, Barbashev started playing hockey there before moving to North America in 2012, where he joined the Moncton Wildcats of the Quebec Major Junior Hockey League (QMJHL). He spent three seasons in the QMJHL before making his professional debut in the AHL, and made his NHL debut in 2017. Internationally, Barbashev has played for the Russian national junior team at several tournaments, winning a silver and bronze medal in consecutive World Junior Championships. Barbashev won the Stanley Cup as a member of the Blues in 2019.

Playing career

Amateur
Barbashev played for HC MVD in the Russian Junior Hockey League (MHL) during the 2011–12 season. In 38 games with the club he recorded 8 goals and 10 points. At the conclusion of the season, Barbashev was selected first overall by the Moncton Wildcats in the 2012 Canadian Hockey League Import Draft.

Barbashev joined the Wildcats in 2012 where he scored 62 points in his first season, and was named to the QMJHL All-Rookie Team. Eligible for the 2014 NHL Entry Draft, Barbashev was the only "A"-rated prospect on the NHL Central Scouting Bureau's preliminary list of players to watch in the QMJHL. After his selection by the Blues in the second round, Barbashev was later signed to a three-year entry-level contract with the club on 21 July 2014.

Professional

Barbashev made his professional debut in the 2015–16 season with the Blues' American Hockey League (AHL) affiliate, the Chicago Wolves. He recorded 28 points in 65 games.

Barbashev made his NHL debut on 25 January 2017 against the Minnesota Wild. At the time he was second on the Wolves in scoring with 37 points in 44 games. His first goal came against Andrew Hammond of the Ottawa Senators on 7 February. Barbashev finished the season playing 30 games for the Blues, where he had 12 points, and had 37 points in 46 games for the Wolves.

Barbashev's first full season with the Blues came in 2018–19, where he recorded 26 points in 80 games. He and the Blues won the Stanley Cup, defeating the Boston Bruins in seven games. In 25 postseason games, he scored six points.

On 1 September 2019, the Blues re-signed Barbashev to a two-year, $2.95 million contract extension.

During the 2022–23 season, having posted 10 goals and 29 points in 59 games with the Blues and with the team out of postseason contention, he was traded to the Vegas Golden Knights in exchange for prospect Zach Dean on 26 February 2023.

International play
Competing internationally with the Russian national junior team, Barbashev won gold at the 2012 World U-17 Hockey Challenge, played at the 2012 Ivan Hlinka Memorial Tournament, placed fourth at the 2013 IIHF World U18 Championships, and won bronze at the 2014 World Junior Ice Hockey Championships. At the 2014 World Juniors, he was the youngest player on the Russian team, and had one goal and one assist.

Personal life
Barbashev began skating at age three. Barbashev's older brother Sergei plays for Admiral Vladivostok of the Kontinental Hockey League (KHL). Barbashev and his wife married in July 2014. He also has a younger brother, Max, who played in the Dynamo Moscow youth system, and is currently playing with the Moncton Wildcats.

Career statistics

Regular season and playoffs

International

Awards and honors

References

External links

 

1995 births
Living people
Chicago Wolves players
Ice hockey people from Moscow
Moncton Wildcats players
Russian ice hockey centres
St. Louis Blues draft picks
St. Louis Blues players
Stanley Cup champions
Vegas Golden Knights players